Carp River is a  river in Chippewa and  Mackinac counties in the U.S. state of Michigan.   of the river were added to the National Wild and Scenic Rivers System in 1992.

Description
The river flows generally south and east into Mackinac County.

The Carp River flows for much of its length through the eastern region of the Hiawatha National Forest.  A central portion of the river, near M-123, flows through the Mackinac Wilderness, jointly preserved by the U.S. Forest Service and the Great Lakes Indian Fish & Wildlife Commission of the Ojibwa Indians.

In contrast to much of the Upper Peninsula, the Carp River's watershed is relatively flat, and there are only a few small rapids on the river.  It is often used by canoeists.  Fishermen can find brook trout, brown trout, and rainbow trout in the river in summer, with some salmon in fall.

Close to its mouth, the Carp River is spanned by the Mackinac Trail – Carp River Bridge, a 1920 spandrel arch bridge that was listed on the National Register of Historic Places in December 1999.

Tributaries and features 
From the mouth:
 Saint Martin Bay
 (left) Red Creek
 (left) Flat Creek
 (right) Platz Lake
 (right) Lower Farm Hill Creek
 (right) Upper Farm Hill Creek
 (right) Spring Lake Creek
 Spring Lake
 (right) North Branch Carp River
 (left) Taylor Creek
 (left) Bissel Creek
 (right) East Lake Branch Carp River
 East Lake
 (left) South Branch Carp River
 Rock Rapids
 (right) Ozark Creek
 (right) Mud Creek
 (left) Mud Lake
 (right) Frenchman Lake
 Wegwaas Lake
 Trout Lake (also known as Big Trout Lake and Carp Lake)
 Schwesinger Creek
 Little Trout Lake
 Kneebone Creek

Drainage basin 
The drainage basin of the Carp River includes all or part of the following:
 Chippewa County
 Trout Lake Township
 Mackinac County
 Brevort Township
 Moran Township
 St. Ignace Township

References

External links
Wild and Scenic River, NPS site

Wild and Scenic Rivers of the United States
Rivers of Michigan
Rivers of Chippewa County, Michigan
Rivers of Mackinac County, Michigan
Tributaries of Lake Huron
Hiawatha National Forest